Matthew Ebden and Ryan Harrison were the defending champions but Harrison decided not to participate.
Ebden played alongside James Cerretani but lost in the first round.

Seeds

Draw

Draw

References
 Main Draw

2012 Hall of Fame Tennis Championships